Dornock is a small Scottish village in Dumfries and Galloway, situated about  west of Eastriggs and  east of Annan. Dornock Burn runs east of the village and the railway between Annan and Gretna is north of the village. The mud and sand banks of the Solway Firth are less than one mile away to the south.

The name Dornock is either from Cumbric durn + -ǭg or Gaelic dòrnach, meaning 'place of handstones (fist-sized stones)', i.e. stones used as projectiles, or perhaps as cobbles. Watson suggests that the [k] in the current pronunciation may imply a Cumbric rather than Gaelic origin.

History

It is famous for the Battle of Dornock during the Wars of Scottish Independence.

A Solway Parish: A History of Dornock  A. Alex. Blaylock (1997?)

Proposed station at Eastriggs
 Eastriggs railway station

References

 Ordnance Survey Landranger Map (number 85)
 Ordnance Survey Explorer Map (number 323) - 1:25,000 scale (2.5 inches to 1 mile)
 Stapleton Tower house.  http://canmore.rcahms.gov.uk/en/site/67010/details/stapleton+tower/

Villages in Dumfries and Galloway
Parishes in Dumfries and Galloway